Cullybackey railway station serves the village of Cullybackey in County Antrim, Northern Ireland.

History

The station was opened by the Ballymena, Ballymoney, Coleraine and Portrush Junction Railway on 1 July 1856. It then closed in September 1856, and was re-opened on 1 March 1865.

There was a further closure on 18 October 1976, and it re-opened again on 28 June 1982.

This station was temporarily closed while a major track relaying programme was in operation between March and the end of June 2009. It reopened on 29 June 2009.

The listed station building is currently (2014) fenced off, bricked/boarded up and derelict. It has been replaced with a small 'bus shelter' type structure on the platform.

Incidents and accidents
On Friday, 24 March 2000, a woman died after a collision involving a passenger train and her car at a level crossing at Station Road, Cullybackey. None of the 88 passengers on board the train travelling from Belfast to Derry were hurt.
The platform at Cullybackey was lengthened to accommodate the longer trains in the evening, coming from Belfast.

Service
In the other direction there is an hourly service , with the last service terminating at 

References 

Railway stations in County Antrim
Railway stations opened in 1865
Railway stations closed in 1976
Railway stations opened in 1982
Railway stations opened by NI Railways
Reopened railway stations in Northern Ireland
Railway stations served by NI Railways
1856 establishments in Ireland
Railway stations in Northern Ireland opened in the 20th century
Railway stations in Northern Ireland opened in the 19th century